Scythris flavoterminella is a moth of the family Scythrididae. It was described by Bengt Å. Bengtsson in 2014. It is found in Rwanda.

References

flavoterminella
Moths described in 2014